Republic of China general election, 2008 may refer to
 2008 Republic of China legislative election
 2008 Republic of China presidential election